Cyril Bos (born 26 September 1972) is a former French cyclist. He competed in the men's team pursuit at the 2000 Summer Olympics.

Palmares

Track
1995
1st World Cup Madison (with Serge Barbara)
1999
1st World Cup Team Pursuit (with Philippe Ermenault, Pommereau Damien and Francis Moreau)

Road
1997
1st Duo Normand (with Henk Vogels)

References

1972 births
Living people
French male cyclists
Olympic cyclists of France
Cyclists at the 2000 Summer Olympics
French track cyclists